Pheray is a 1949 Pakistani Punjabi-language film directed by Nazir Ahmed Khan. The story of the film was a remake of Nazir's own 1945 Indian film Gaon Ki Gori, that was released before partition. The music was given by Ghulam Ahmed Chishti and lyrics were written by G. A. Chishti and Baba Alam Siaposh. 

The singers were Munawar Sultana and Inayat Hussain Bhatti. The film was released on 28 July 1949.

Pheray (1949 film) was a big musical hit and became Pakistan's first  'Silver Jubilee' film. It was screened in Lahore for 25 weeks at Palace Cinema and in Karachi for 5 weeks at Taj Mahal cinema.

Plot 
Film Pheray was almost an identical love story as the famous folk story of Heer Ranjha. Sawarn Lata loves Nazir but her brother Allauddin is against their relationship. He marries her off with a wealthy man M. Ismael. The Hindu wedding ritual of seven steps around the fire (Pheray) are taken by Sawarn Lata's best friend Zeenat, who is entirely hidden in a traditional wedding dress. Sawarn Lata moves to her new home but plays a sick woman to avoid any sexual relations with her husband. M. Ismael is getting tired of her sickness and finally finds out the real fact of her behavior. He decides to re-arrange the wedding ceremony, but not with him this time, but with his wife's lover - and that was a happy end of Pakistan's first super hit musical film.

Cast 
 Swaran Lata 
 Nazir Ahmed Khan 
 Muhammad Ismael
Allauddin
Baba Alam Siaposh
 Nazar
 Zeenat Begum 
 Maya Devi

References

External links
 

1949 films
Pakistani black-and-white films
Films scored by Ghulam Ahmed Chishti
Pakistani remakes of Indian films
Punjabi-language Pakistani films
Pakistani musical films
1940s Punjabi-language films
1949 musical films